Bunker Hill is a historic home at Millersville, Anne Arundel County, Maryland, United States.  It is a large, eclectic, frame dwelling which reflects several periods of growth. The final composition embodies the late-19th century Victorian Picturesque, A.J. Downing "cottage" style of architecture. The main block, which contains the principal entrance, was constructed about 1820 and a large two story wing was added to the rear about 1870. Later additions occurred throughout the 20th Century. Several 19th century frame outbuildings and a caretaker's house are on the site, including a smokehouse/dairy, root cellar, tool house, chicken house, slave quarters, carriage house, ice house, pumphouse, barn, and corncrib.

Bunker Hill was listed on the National Register of Historic Places in 1984.

References

External links
, including photo from 1975, at Maryland Historical Trust

Houses on the National Register of Historic Places in Maryland
Houses in Anne Arundel County, Maryland
National Register of Historic Places in Anne Arundel County, Maryland
Slave cabins and quarters in the United States